Folkwin, also spelled Folcwin, Folcuin or Volkwin, may refer to:
Folcwin (died 855), bishop of Thérouanne
Folcuin (died 990), abbot of Lobbes
Volkwin (died 1236), master of the Livonian Swordbrothers